Triticum aethiopicum, commonly known as Ethiopian wheat, is a variety of wheat closely related to Triticum durum. Ethiopia is considered as a center of origin and diversity for many crop species including tetraploids wheat species. Triticum aethiopiacum is one of the tetraploid wheat grown in Ethiopia.

References

Wheat